Sarajevo School of Science and Technology (SSST) is a private university, located in metropolitan area of Sarajevo, Bosnia and Herzegovina, within the municipality of Ilidža, 10 miles west from Baščaršija. The university offers bachelor's degrees, master's degrees and doctorate degrees.

The university is in partnership with University of Buckingham of the United Kingdom.

The Sarajevo School of Science and Technology is an English language-based university.

On 6 June 2018, the University Sarajevo School of Science and Technology (SSST) was ranked as one of the top 600 universities in the world and the best ranked university in the Southeastern Europe (Slovenia, Croatia, Bosnia and Herzegovina, Montenegro, Albania, Kosovo, Serbia, North Macedonia, Romania and Bulgaria) on the QS World University Rankings for the upcoming 2019 year. SSST was on the 571st place while others, like University of Ljubljana was ranked as 651st and University of Zagreb and University of Belgrade shared the 801st position.

Organization
The seven departments into which the university is divided are as follows:

 Department of Computer Science
 Department of Information Systems
 Department of Economics
 Department of Political Science & International Relations
 Department of Engineering Science
 Department of Modern Languages
 Sarajevo Film Academy
 Sarajevo Medical School

See also
:Category:Academic staff of the Sarajevo School of Science and Technology

References

Education in Bosnia and Herzegovina
Universities in Sarajevo
Educational institutions established in 2004
2004 establishments in Bosnia and Herzegovina